The Devon Intermediate Cup is an annual rugby union knock-out club competition organized by the Devon Rugby Football Union.  It was first introduced during the 2009-10 season with Okehampton being the inaugural winners.  The competition was briefly discontinued at the end of the 2015-16 season due to a perceived lack of interest from clubs with the 2014 final being cancelled and the 2016 winners, Kingsbridge, only playing one game (the final) due to teams being unable/or unwilling to fulfil fixtures.  It was reinstated once more for the 2017-18 season.

The Intermediate Cup is currently the secondary cup competition in the county behind the Devon Senior Cup but ahead of the Devon Junior Cup, for club sides based in Devon that play in tier 7 (Tribute Western Counties West) of the English rugby union league system.  Since 2018–19 the format will change from a knockout cup competition to a hybrid league-cup.   Running alongside it will be the Devon Intermediate Shield, which is for club sides in Devon that play in tier 8 (Tribute Cornwall/Devon) and will also use the a hybrid league-cup format.

Format from 2018–19

Intermediate Cup 

Previously a knockout cup competition, for the 2018-19 season the format has been changed to a mini league, with league results between Devon teams playing in Tribute Western Counties West also counted towards the Devon Intermediate Cup.  At the end of the season the top two teams in this mini-league will then meet in the cup final, to be held at the home ground of the club with the superior league record.  It is worth noting that these top two teams will not necessary be the highest ranked sides in Tribute Western Counties West, as only games played against teams in Devon will count in the Intermediate Cup.

Intermediate Shield 

Running alongside the Intermediate is the Devon Intermediate Plate.  This will also involve a mini league with results for the Devon teams in Tribute Cornwall/Devon counting towards the Shield, with the two top teams meeting in a final at the end of the season, at the home ground of the club with the superior record.

Devon Intermediate Cup winners

Devon Intermediate Plate winners

Devon Intermediate Shield winners

Number of wins

Cup
Bideford (2)
Sidmouth (2)
Ivybridge (1)
Kingsbridge (1)
Okehampton (1)
Teignmouth (1)

Plate
Honiton (1)
Torquay Athletic (1)

Shield
Honiton (1)
Withycombe (1)

Notes

See also
 Devon RFU
 Devon Senior Cup
 Devon Junior Cup
 David Butt Memorial Trophy
 Havill Plate
 English rugby union system
 Rugby union in England

References

External links
 Devon RFU

Recurring sporting events established in 2009
2009 establishments in England
Rugby union cup competitions in England
Rugby union in Devon